Kadha, Samvidhanam Kunchakko is a 2009 Malayalam-language psychological thriller directed by Haridas Kesavan, and produced by Manoj Ramsingh. The film features Sreenivasan and Meena in the lead roles.

Plot 
Kunchacko, a no-holds-barred money minter who has chopped off heads and hearts on his way to the top of the world. Marrying Ann Mary prompts him to turn a few new green leaves, though he soon figures out that making amends is not as easy as it seems.

Cast 
 Sreenivasan as Kunchacko / Kuncheria (dual role)
 Meena as Ann Mary
 Augustine as Kariyappi
 Ganesh Kumar as SP Manoj Pothan
 Shivaji Guruvayoor as Sadanandan
 Janardhanan as Chief Minister
 Sona Nair
 Prem Kumar as Dr. Mathew Kurian
 E.A. Rajendran as Chandran Pillai
 Jagathy Sreekumar
 Sudheesh as Bobby
 Thilakan as Psychiatrist
 Lakshmipriya as Dr. Mathew Kurian's wife

References

External links
 
 Kadha, Samvidhanam Kunchakko at Cinefundas.com

2009 films
2000s Malayalam-language films
Films scored by M. Jayachandran